Leo James Terrell (born February 1, 1955) is an American civil rights attorney and talk radio host based in Los Angeles, California. He has frequently appeared on Fox News programs, such as Hannity and The O'Reilly Factor. Previously a Democrat, in a July 2020 interview, he declared his support for President Donald Trump—the first time he declared support for a Republican Party presidential candidate. Referring to his new self as "Leo 2.0", Terrell says that he is a happier person as a Republican.

Education
Terrell graduated from Gardena High School of Harbor Gateway, Los Angeles in 1972  and California State University, Dominguez Hills in 1977 with a BA. Terrell taught high school history, geography and economics  at Gage Middle School in Huntington Park, California. He holds a master's degree in education from Pepperdine University and holds a J.D. degree from the UCLA School of Law.

Radio career
With former Los Angeles Superior Court judge Burton Katz, Terrell co-hosted the weekday talk show Terrell & Katz that debuted on June 3, 1996, on KMPC radio in Los Angeles. Terrell & Katz was a point-counterpoint program with Terrell as the liberal voice and Katz the conservative. Starting October 5, 1996, Terrell and Katz moved to weekends on KABC. Terrell continued to host a weekend legal show on KABC until August 15, 2010, and continues to be a recurring guest host for KABC's The Peter Tilden Show. As of July 2021, Leo has returned to KABC with a new daily afternoon drive show called Leo 2.0 Live @ 5.

Legal career
On December 4, 1990, Terrell became a member of the California Bar.

He was the Chairman of the Black-Korean Alliance, an Advisory Board Member for the U.S. Equal Employment Opportunity Commission (EEOC), and a member of the Statewide Commission Against Hate Crimes. Terrell wrote the book Your Rights at the Workplace--The Things Your Boss Won't Tell You in 1998.

Terrell became a member of the NAACP in 1990 and did pro bono legal work for the organization. After Terrell expressed support for Carolyn Kuhl, a Los Angeles County judge nominated by President George W. Bush to the United States Court of Appeals for the Ninth Circuit whose nomination was filibustered in the U.S. Senate, he left the NAACP and accused the organization of "bullying" him out. NAACP Washington, D.C. office director Hilary O. Shelton responded: "He’s not an NAACP lawyer, not even a former NAACP lawyer. He’s done volunteer work for us, which we appreciate. But when he takes a position that is diametrically opposite from our position, he’s not speaking for us."

Terrell has provided legal and political commentary on TV and radio programs such as Nightline, Larry King Live, Hannity & Colmes, The O'Reilly Factor,  Today, Good Morning America, and various radio programs. A family friend of O. J. Simpson, Terrell provided expert legal commentary about Simpson's civil trial.

In 2003, Terrell ran for the seat of District 10 on the Los Angeles City Council and came in fifth place among seven candidates.

Notable cases
In 1995, Terrell represented Kumasi Simmons, a former football player from Centennial High School in Compton expelled for hitting a referee. Simmons accused the referee of using racial epithets. Terrell accused the Beverly Hills Police Department of intimidating witnesses who could back up Simmons's claim.

In 1999, Terrell called on the Los Angeles police commission to hear witnesses who claimed that a homeless woman, Margaret Laverne Mitchell, was running when police officers shot her.

In 2012, Terrell called for an investigation of misconduct by trainees of the Los Angeles County Sheriff's Department.

References

Bibliography

External links

1955 births
Living people
African-American lawyers
African-American radio personalities
Activists for African-American civil rights
American talk radio hosts
Black conservatism in the United States
Lawyers from Los Angeles
California Democrats
California Republicans
California State University, Dominguez Hills alumni
Fox News people
Pepperdine University alumni
UCLA School of Law alumni
Radio personalities from Los Angeles
African-American schoolteachers
Activists from California
Gardena High School alumni
21st-century African-American people
20th-century African-American people